Ryokufūkai may refer to:
Ryokufūkai (1947–60), a defunct political party in Japan
Ryokufūkai (1964–65), a defunct political party in Japan